Josef Stoer (born 21 June 1934) is a German mathematician specializing in numerical analysis and professor emeritus of the Institut für Mathematik of Universität Würzburg.

He was born in Meschede, and earned his Ph.D. in 1961 at Johannes Gutenberg-Universität Mainz under Friedrich Ludwig Bauer and Klaus Samelson. He has advised over 20 doctoral students.

He is the author (with Roland Bulirsch) of Introduction to Numerical Analysis, a standard reference for the theory of numerical methods. He has an honorary doctorate from the University of Augsburg (2007) and the Technical University of Munich (1997) and is a member of the Bavarian Academy of Sciences (1981). The Bulirsch–Stoer algorithm is named after him and Bulirsch.

References

20th-century German mathematicians
1934 births
Living people
Numerical analysts
21st-century German mathematicians